The 1891–92 season was Newton Heath LYR's third and final season in the Football Alliance. They applied for election to the Football League towards the end of the season, and, due to their second-place finish in the Alliance, the League accepted the application. The club also took part in the FA Cup, reaching the Fourth Qualifying Round; the Lancashire Senior Cup, in which they were knocked out by Bury in the first round; and the Manchester Senior Cup, in which they reached the semi-finals before being knocked out by Bolton Wanderers.

Football Alliance

FA Cup

Lancashire Senior Cup

Manchester Senior Cup

References

Manchester United F.C. seasons
Newton Heath Lyr